Chris Piche is a Canadian computer scientist and technology entrepreneur who specializes in peer-to-peer networking, streaming, and computer vision technologies.

Piche pioneered the technology behind online multiplayer gaming and formed a joint venture with Stanley Ho and Sociedade de Turismo e Diversoes de Macau (STDM) to create the first Internet-based, real-time casino platform.  Piche then built Eyeball Chat – an early instant messaging, Voice over IP, and video telephony service with over 7 million active users in 2012.

Piche is recognised as the creator of the STUN, TURN, and ICE, NAT traversal protocols which enable peer-to-peer networking, file sharing, and Voice over IP.

Education

Chris Piche was born in Vancouver, Canada.  He began programming computers at age 11, entered university at the age of 13, and later graduated in computer science from the University of British Columbia.

Career

Online multiplayer gaming
Beginning in 2000, Piche pioneered the technology behind online multiplayer gaming and formed a joint venture with Stanley Ho and Sociedade de Turismo e Diversoes de Macau (STDM) to create the first Internet-based, real-time casino platform.

Piche and Ho later defeated patent trolls in the United States District Court for the District of Nevada, where Piche was awarded $1,361,418.79 USD in fees, costs, and damages.

Video telephony
Piche created Eyeball Chat, a popular instant messaging, Voice over IP, and video telephony service with over 7 million active users.  Eyeball Chat was awarded as Best Communication Product of Internet World.

In a joint venture with Nifty, a Japanese ISP and Fujitsu subsidiary, Piche created Eyeball Lite and Eyeball Pro, video telephony services for the Japanese market.

Peer-to-peer networking
Piche is recognised as the creator of the STUN, TURN, and ICE, NAT traversal protocols which enable peer-to-peer networking, file sharing, and Voice over IP.

Asia-Pacific Economic Cooperation
Piche was Canada's representative to the Asia-Pacific Economic Cooperation (APEC) Information and Communications Technology Forum in Shanghai in 2001.

Awards and recognition
 Canada's Top Young Leader, The Globe and Mail, 2000
 Top 40 under 40, Business in Vancouver, 2000
 Best of Internet World, 2001
 Ernst & Young Entrepreneur of the Year Award finalist, 2006

References 

1973 births
Living people